Lincoln David Stein is a scientist and Professor in bioinformatics and computational biology at the Ontario Institute for Cancer Research.

Education 
Stein completed a Doctor of Medicine at Harvard Medical School and a PhD in Cell Biology at Harvard University both in 1989 via the MD-PhD program. His thesis investigated gene cloning in Schistosoma mansoni.

Career
From 1992-1997 he was a director of informatics at the Massachusetts Institute of Technology (MIT) Genome Centre, Whitehead Institute of Biomedical Research. From 1998 to 2004 he was an associate professor at Cold Spring Harbor Laboratory. He has been working at the Ontario Institute for Cancer Research since 2007.

Research
Stein's current research projects include Reactome, WormBase, BioPerl, Gramene, ENCODE, the Generic Model Organism Database, the Sequence Ontology and Cloud computing.

Stein is also the original developer of CGI.pm and a contributor to mod_perl, both widely used in the Perl programming language for web applications, as well as many other Perl modules and associated books.

Awards and honours
Stein was awarded the Benjamin Franklin Award (Bioinformatics) in 2004. He was elected an ISCB Fellow in 2016 by the International Society for Computational Biology.

References 

Living people
American bioinformaticians
Perl people
Harvard Medical School alumni
1960 births
Fellows of the International Society for Computational Biology